Mark Irwin  (born August 7, 1950) is a Canadian cinematographer.

He was born in Toronto, Ontario, and studied political science at the University of Waterloo and filmmaking at York University.

He is widely known for his early collaborations with David Cronenberg on films such as Fast Company, Scanners, Videodrome, The Dead Zone, and The Fly. Irwin has also been a main collaborator for several directors such as Wes Craven, Todd Phillips and The Farrelly brothers. He has worked primarily in the genres of horror and comedy film. He is a four-time recipient of the C.S.C. Award for Best Cinematography in a Theatrical Feature, and a Genie Award nominee.

Filmography

Film

Television

Awards and nominations

Won
 CSC Award for Best Cinematography in a Theatrical Feature
 Videodrome (1983)
 The Dead Zone (1983)
 Youngblood (1986)
 The Fly (1986)

Nominated
 CableACE Award for Direction of Photography and/or Lighting Direction for a Comedy or Dramatic Series: 
 The Ray Bradbury Theater (1985; 1 episode)
 Genie Award for Best Achievement in Cinematography:
 Videodrome (1983)

References

External links
 
 
Mark Irwin – cinematographers.nl

1950 births
Canadian cinematographers
Living people
People from Toronto
University of Waterloo alumni
York University alumni